Sander Gillé and Joran Vliegen were the defending champions but chose not to defend their title.

Ruben Gonzales and Nathaniel Lammons won the title after defeating Luis David Martínez and Gonçalo Oliveira 6–3, 6–7(8–10), [10–5] in the final.

Seeds

Draw

References
 Main Draw

The Hague Open - Doubles
2018 Doubles